Bruno is a town located 90 km  east of Saskatoon and 35 km west of Humboldt. Its current mayor is Dale Glessman.

Bruno is the only community in the prairies to hold an annual cherry festival.

Bruno Clayworks, located 4 km west of Bruno, produced over one million bricks between the years 1905 and the 1960s. The historic Old Fire Hall and Jail, a heritage building housing the Bruno Museum, was built from bricks manufactured at the brick plant, as were many other area buildings. The bricks manufactured by the Bruno Clayworks were a unique sideways "T" shape which allowed rows of bricks to interlock when rotated 180º.

History 
Bruno was named after Father Bruno Doefler, who came to the area along with other Germans from Minnesota in 1902.

From 1911 to 1919 Bruno Doefler was Abbot of the Territorial Abbey of Saint Peter-Muenster. The territory of the Territorial abbey (Abbey Nullius) which included Bruno was also referred to as St. Peter's Colony.

Ursuline Convent
In 1919 the Ursuline Sisters opened a convent and in 1922 an academy called St. Ursula's Academy was established. The convent and academy building of 1919 was expanded in the 1950s with an extension which included the chapel. In 1952 there were 80 professed sisters, up from 55 in 1934. Additional building expansions happened in 1962 (gymnasium) and 1977 (convent infirmary wing). The academy graduated its last class in 1982.

Eight stained glass windows from the convent chapel have been moved to the Holy Spirit Church in Saskatoon, Vanier Collegiate in Moose Jaw, and Villa Angela and the Humboldt Museum in nearby Humboldt.

St. Therese Institute of Faith and Mission
On July 1, 2007, the Ursuline facility changed ownership and became the home of St. Therese Institute of Faith and Mission, a Catholic post-secondary school of faith formation; and the St. Therese Healing and Growth Center (now no longer operating), a retreat center for personal inner healing based on Catholic and scriptural traditions. St. Therese Institute opened its doors to its inaugural class in September 2007; the Healing and Growth Center operated from 2008 to 2015. St. Therese Institute of Faith and Mission (and from 2007-2008, St. Therese Catholic College of Faith and Mission) is the operating name of St. Therese School of Faith and Mission Inc. It is a Canadian registered charitable organization.

Demographics 

See also
 List of communities in Saskatchewan
 List of towns in Saskatchewan

Notes

References

Towns in Saskatchewan
Bayne No. 371, Saskatchewan
Division No. 15, Saskatchewan